Maxime Sekamana (born 23 December 1995) is a Rwandan football striker who currently plays for Rayon Sports.

References

1995 births
Living people
Rwandan footballers
Rwanda international footballers
APR F.C. players
Rayon Sports F.C. players
Association football forwards